Fred T. Foard High School is a public, coeducational high school located in the community of Propst Crossroads, ten miles (16 km) west of Newton, North Carolina, United States.  The school is part of the Catawba County Schools system.  Foard has been designated a school of distinction by the state of North Carolina for academic progress.  The school opened in 1953 and was named after Fred T. Foard, a medical doctor in the area.

History 

Land was purchased for building a new high school on October 10, 1950. On January 2, 1951, the school board voted to name the school Fred T. Foard High School after Dr. Fred Theopheolus Foard, a member of the Catawba County Board of Education from 1923 to 1931. Construction began on the high school on June 4, 1951. Fred T. Foard would open in 1953.

Athletics 
The mascot is the Tiger and the school colors are Columbia Blue and White. The athletic department also uses Navy Blue to accent the main colors. Fred T. Foard is a member of the North Carolina High School Athletic Association (NCHSAA) and is currently classified as a 3A school. 

Fred T. Foard has won the following team NCHSAA state championships:

 All Classes Women's Basketball – 1975
 2A/3A/4A Softball – 1997
 3A Softball – 1991, 1998
 3A Volleyball – 1995, 1996, 1997, 2002, 2003, 2005
 2A Volleyball – 2019, 2020-21
 3A Women's Basketball – 1992
 3A Wrestling State Dual Team – 2013, 2015, 2022
 3A Wrestling State Tournament – 2011, 2022
 2A Wrestling State Dual Team – 2020
 2A Wrestling State Tournament – 2018

Notable alumni 
Matt DiBenedetto, NASCAR Cup Series driver
Jon Reep, actor and comedian

References

External links
 
 School information on Greatschools.net
 Schools of Distinction 2004-2005. North Carolina Public Schools. Retrieved on 2008-02-03.

Schools in Catawba County, North Carolina
Educational institutions established in 1953
Public high schools in North Carolina
1953 establishments in North Carolina